The Sri Lankan women's national basketball team is the basketball team representing Sri Lanka in international competitions.

It is administered by the Sri Lanka Basketball Federation (SLBF).

Current roster
Roster for the 2017 FIBA Women's Asia Cup.

See also
Sri Lanka women's national under-19 basketball team
Sri Lanka women's national under-17 basketball team
Sri Lanka women's national 3x3 team

References

External links
Official website
FIBA profile

 
Women's national basketball teams